This list of streets and squares in Cardiff, Wales, includes notable outdoor thoroughfares and formal public spaces in the city.

Roads
 Cathedral Road, Pontcanna
 City Road, Plasnewydd
 Cowbridge Road East and Cowbridge Road West, the main road to the west
 Newport Road, the main road to the east

Streets 
 Bute Street, Butetown (Cardiff Bay)
 Caroline Street, city centre, also known as Chip Alley or Chippy Lane.
 Lloyd George Avenue, Atlantic Wharf (Cardiff Bay)
 St. Mary Street, city centre
 The Hayes, city centre
 West Grove, Roath

Squares 
 Callaghan Square, city centre, previously known as Bute Square.
 Central Square, city centre, included the bus station between 1954 and 2015.
 Loudoun Square, Butetown
 Mount Stuart Square, Butetown
 Roald Dahl Plass, Cardiff Bay.

See also
 List of shopping arcades in Cardiff

References

 
Cardiff-related lists